Joshila (English: Spirited) is a 1973 Bollywood thriller film directed by Yash Chopra. The film stars Dev Anand, Hema Malini and Raakhee. Most outdoor parts of the movie were shot in Darjeeling, West Bengal. The film is loosely inspired by James Hadley Chase's 1959 novel, Shock Treatment.

Cast

Dev Anand - Amar
Hema Malini - Shalini
Raakhee - Sapna 
Pran - Thakur Rajpal Singh
Bindu - Rani
Madan Puri - Madanlal Dogra 
Manmohan Krishna - Jailor
Padma Khanna - Manju
A. K. Hangal - Lala Gulzarilal
Sulochana Latkar - Mrs. Gulzarilal 
Sudhir - Kundan
Hercules - Sher Singh
Master Satyajeet - Ravi
I. S. Johar - Raunaq Singh
Vikas Anand - Manohar
Roopesh Kumar - Dinesh (Sapna's Brother)
Iftekhar - Inspector Manjit
Jagdish Raj - (as Jagdishraj)
Mahendra Sandhu
Uma Dutt - Solicitor

Plot
Jailor Manmohan Krishan is responsible for looking after convicts undergoing sentences of rigorous imprisonment. He has a young, beautiful and captivating daughter named Shalini. Shalini is a poet, one day while reciting her poetry, she meets with a young man, who introduces himself as Amar, who also happens to be a poet himself. The two of them spend beautiful moments together and finds themselves attracted to each other. Shalini wants to find out why Amar is in jail. She is told in no uncertain terms that Amar is in jail for murder - for killing the brother of his former lover, Sapna. She also found out that this is not true and would strive to the best of her merit to get Amar release from jail because she is in love with him and would like to marry him. Later after his release he found his mother in a very poor condition, he also found his sister as a dancer in a nightclub, where Madanlal Dogra an old friend from his prisoners day came to him, and assured to help him. Later Madanlal murdered by some of his rivals. Amar decided to go for the job as Madanlal Dogra, where he finds Shalini in Darjeeling Station. Amar joined as a estate manager in Thakur Rajpal Singh's estate. In some days he realised that Thakur's wife was intended to kill her husband. Shalini later came as Thakur Rajpal Singh's daughter. After police vigorously search for the murderer of Dogra they found the name of Amer. Knowing the truth Amer's mother rush for Darjeeling, where she was kidnapped by Kundan with her family. At last Amer saves Thakur Rajpal Singh and his family after a fight, married Shalini and the started to live Darjeeling, with his family.

Crew
Director - Yash Chopra
Story - Gulshan Nanda
Screenplay - Akhtar Mirza, C. J. Pavri
Dialogue - Akhtar-Ul-Iman
Producer - Gulshan Rai
Editor - Pran Mehra
Cinematographer - Fali Mistry
Art Director - R. G. Gaekwad
Assistant Director - Ramesh Talwar (chief), Vasudev Dheer, Dilip Naik
Assistant Editor - T. R. Mangeshkar (chief), Achyut Y. Gupte (color consultant)
Assistant Art Director - Sudhir Gaekwad
Stunts - Ravi Khanna, M. B. Shetty
Makeup - Pandhari Juker
Production Manager - R. L. Bajaj, Devdutt Bharti
Costume and Wardrobe - Meeta Hassan, Wilmary Ventura, Suresh Bhatt, P. L. Raj
Original Music - R. D. Burman
Music Assistant - Manohari Singh
Lyricist - Sahir Ludhianvi
Playback Singers - Asha Bhosle, Kishore Kumar, Lata Mangeshkar

Music

External links
 
 Joshila at Yash Raj Films

References

1973 films
Trimurti Films
1970s Hindi-language films
1970s thriller films
Films directed by Yash Chopra
Films scored by R. D. Burman
Indian prison films